Arabineura is a genus of damselfly in the family Protoneuridae. It contains the following species:
 Arabineura khalidi

Protoneuridae
Taxonomy articles created by Polbot